Kurt Magnus Atterberg (12 December 188715 February 1974) was a Swedish composer and engineer. He is best known for his symphonies, operas, and ballets.

Biography

Atterberg was born in Gothenburg. His father was Anders Johan Atterberg, engineer; his uncle was the chemist Albert Atterberg. His mother, Elvira Uddman, was the daughter of a famous male opera singer.

In 1902, Atterberg began learning the cello, having been inspired by a concert by the Brussels String Quartet, featuring a performance of Beethoven's String Quartet No. 8. Six years later he became a performer in the Stockholm Concert Society, now known as the Royal Stockholm Philharmonic Orchestra, as well as publishing his first completed work, the Rhapsody for Piano and Orchestra, Op. 1. His String Quartet No. 1 in D major, Op. 2, soon followed.

While already studying civil engineering at the Royal Institute of Technology, Atterberg also enrolled at the Royal College of Music, Stockholm in 1910 with a score of his Rhapsody and an incomplete version of his Symphony No. 1. There he studied composition and orchestration under the composer Andreas Hallén. He earned his engineering diploma a year later, as well as being awarded a State Music Fellowship. He made his conducting debut at a concert in Gothenburg in 1912, premiering his first symphony and the Concert Overture in A minor, Op. 4.

Although continuing to compose and conduct, Atterberg enjoyed a fulfilling career in several different organisations. He accepted a post at the Swedish Patent and Registration Office in 1912, going on to become a head of department in 1936, and working there until his retirement in 1968. He co-founded the Society of Swedish Composers in 1918, alongside other prominent composers such as Ture Rangström, Wilhelm Stenhammar and Hugo Alfvén. Six years later he was elected president of the society, maintaining the position until 1947. At a similar time, he became president of the Svenska Tonsättares Internationella Musikbyrå, which he also helped to found, and of which his presidency lasted until 1943. Other jobs taken on by Atterberg included his work as a music critic for the Stockholms Tidningen from 1919 to 1957, and as secretary of the Royal Swedish Academy of Music from 1940 to 1953.

Atterberg died on 15 February 1974 in Stockholm, aged 86, and was buried there in the Northern Cemetery.

Ties to the Third Reich 
During the Third Reich era, Atterberg maintained contact with German composers and music bodies, in order to strengthen Swedish-German music relations. 

After World War II, Atterberg wanted to free himself from suspicion of being a Nazi sympathizer. The Royal Academy of Music set up an inquiry of Atterberg at his own request. The investigation could neither confirm nor refute the accusations that he was a Nazi sympathizer.

Works

Atterberg composed nine symphonies (or ten if the Symphony for Strings, Op. 53, is included). His Ninth Symphony (entitled Sinfonia Visionaria) was, like Beethoven's, scored for orchestra and chorus with vocal soloists. His output also includes six concertante works (including his Rhapsody, Op. 1, and a cello concerto), nine orchestral suites, three string quartets, a Sonata in B minor, five operas and two ballets.

For the 100th anniversary of the death of Schubert in 1928, the Columbia Graphophone Company sponsored a worldwide symphony competition in which composers were to write a symphony completing, or inspired by, Schubert's "Unfinished" Symphony. Atterberg entered his Symphony No. 6 in C major, Op. 31, and was awarded first prize, winning $10,000. The symphony, which was later known as the "Dollar Symphony", was recorded by Sir Thomas Beecham. The symphony was performed by Arturo Toscanini in 1943, during an NBC Symphony Orchestra broadcast concert; a performance which Atterberg praised on hearing the recorded broadcast.

On February 22, 2005, CPO Records released a complete box set of recordings of Atterberg's symphonies, as well as the symphonic poem Älven – Från Fjällen till Havet (The River – From the Mountains to the Sea). The recordings were performed by the NDR Radiophilharmonie, Hamburg, Radio-Sinfonie-Orchester Stuttgart and the Radio-Sinfonie-Orchester Frankfurt, all conducted by Finnish conductor . Between 2013 and 2016, a second complete set of symphonies, with added material, was recorded by the Gothenburg Symphony Orchestra under the direction of Neeme Järvi and released on the Chandos label.

Personal life

Atterberg married twice, first Ella Peterson, a pianist, in 1915; they divorced eight years later. His second marriage was to Margareta Dalsjö in 1925, which lasted until her death in 1962.

References
Notes

Sources

Kurt Atterberg by Elsa Stuart-Bergstrom

External links

1887 births
1974 deaths
20th-century Swedish engineers
20th-century classical composers
Swedish opera composers
Male opera composers
Ballet composers
KTH Royal Institute of Technology alumni
Swedish classical composers
Swedish male classical composers
Musicians from Gothenburg
Royal College of Music, Stockholm alumni
Members of the Royal Swedish Academy of Music
Burials at Norra begravningsplatsen
20th-century Swedish male musicians
20th-century Swedish musicians